Janževski Vrh is a settlement in the hills above the right bank of the Drava River in the Municipality of Podvelka in Slovenia.

It gets its name from the local church, dedicated to John the Baptist (Janž in the local dialect). It belongs to the Parish of Ribnica na Pohorju and is a Late Gothic building from the first half of the 16th century. The internal furnishings date to the 17th century.

References

External links

Janževski Vrh on Geopedia

Populated places in the Municipality of Podvelka